Sanja Popović Gamma (born 31 May 1984) is a Croatian volleyball player. She last played as opposite spiker for Vasas SC.

She competed at the 2010 and 2014 FIVB Volleyball Women's World Championship.

Personal life 
In June 2016, Popović married basketball player Kamaldin Gamma. In January 2022, she gave birth to their daughter.

References

External links
 
 Sanja Popović Gamma at WorldofVolley.com
 

1984 births
Living people
Croatian women's volleyball players
Sportspeople from Rijeka
Opposite hitters
Beşiktaş volleyballers
Expatriate volleyball players in Italy
Expatriate volleyball players in Turkey
Expatriate volleyball players in South Korea
Expatriate volleyball players in the Czech Republic
Expatriate volleyball players in Poland
Expatriate volleyball players in Russia
Expatriate volleyball players in Hungary
Croatian expatriate volleyball players
Croatian expatriate sportspeople in Italy
Croatian expatriate sportspeople in Turkey
Croatian expatriate sportspeople in South Korea
Croatian expatriate sportspeople in the Czech Republic
Croatian expatriate sportspeople in Poland
Croatian expatriate sportspeople in Russia
Mediterranean Games medalists in volleyball
Mediterranean Games gold medalists for Croatia
Mediterranean Games bronze medalists for Croatia
Competitors at the 2009 Mediterranean Games
Competitors at the 2018 Mediterranean Games
21st-century Croatian women